"Gramma" is a short horror story by American author Stephen King. It was first published in Weirdbook magazine in 1984 and collected in King's 1985 collection called Skeleton Crew. Certain characters/creatures/unearthly powers featured in the works of H. P. Lovecraft also appear in this story, making it a story set in the Cthulhu Mythos.

Plot summary
An 11-year-old boy named George Bruckner is at home with his mother, Ruth, when the two find out that George's 13-year-old brother Buddy has broken his ankle playing baseball. George's mother must go into the city, 19 miles away, to pick up Buddy at the hospital, but someone must stay home to watch her own mother, a huge, cantankerous, ancient, bedridden woman. George reluctantly volunteers.

As George sets about the kitchen after his mother leaves, he begins to think about his "Gramma" and recalls the first time she came to the house. He had been six years old, and the old woman demanded that he come to her that she could "give him a hug". George was terrified by the idea and cried endlessly. His mother eventually pacified Gramma, promising that he would hug her "in time".

George waits for his mother to return. As the hours pass, strange thoughts—events he had witnessed earlier—begin to surface in his mind. He recalls overhearing his mother's siblings begging her to care for the old woman: "You're the only one who can quiet her down, Ruth." Eventually, Ruth was forced to leave San Francisco and move to Castle Rock, Maine to care for their mother. George also recalls that Gramma had been kicked out of her church, as well as dismissed from her position as a schoolteacher, for owning particular books. He finally remembers that the woman had been infertile for a long while, any pregnancies she did achieve ending in miscarriages or stillbirths and it was only after being excommunicated that she became pregnant and gave birth to a healthy child.

George suddenly hears a scraping sound on sheets; he imagines Gramma's long, ragged fingernails rubbing against her bed. He enters to check on her and watches the obese, white, almost formless woman for a few moments. Quite suddenly, he recalls other memories: his Gramma uttering strange words one night, and relatives dying the next morning. George abruptly realizes that his grandmother is a witch, having gained dark powers from reading the forbidden tomes.

As George makes this realization, he realizes that his Gramma has died. Though terrified, he holds a mirror before her nose, making sure. Once he is convinced, he prepares to make a phone call to the doctor, only to find that his neighbors are talking on the party line and he can't use the phone. George opts to wait for his mother to come home, and thinks of the praise he will gain for handling the situation so calmly, until he realizes that he did not cover his grandmother's face. He imagines his brother tormenting him endlessly for this "cowardly" lack of action.

Determined, George enters the dead woman's room and places a sheet over her flabby face. As he does, her hand suddenly wraps around his wrist and holds it for a few moments. George flees the room, injuring his nose in the process. As he tries to rationalize the movement, he hears groaning from the next room, as though the corpse was trying to get off of the bed. He then hears his Gramma calling him: "Come here, Georgie... Gramma wants to give you a hug."

George is terrified and races from the room. He hears the enormous woman stumbling after him, and even guesses that as a witch, she waited until she was alone with him to die. His Aunt Flo calls, and he tries to explain the situation as Gramma enters the kitchen. Aunt Flo tells him that he must invoke the name of Hastur and tell Gramma to "lie down" in his name. Gramma knocks the phone from his hand, and George screams the phrase repeatedly: "You have to lie down! In Hastur's name! Lie down!" Gramma wraps her arms around him.

The story jumps to an hour later, with George sitting calmly at the kitchen table. When Ruth returns, George runs to her, explaining that Gramma died. His mother fearfully asks if "anything else happened." George denies it and goes off to his room to sleep. It is implied that Gramma has possessed George, turning the boy into an evil warlock, as he used a spell to strike down his Aunt Flo with an aneurysm. The story ends with George grinning wickedly, imagining the kind of torture he will be able to inflict on his brother. It is not clarified if George has been possessed by the dead woman's spirit or has absorbed her evil powers to use as his own.

Film, TV, and theatrical adaptations
The story was made into an episode of The Twilight Zone in 1986; the screenplay was written by Harlan Ellison. Some of the voice over for "Gramma" was done by Piper Laurie, who had previously starred in the first film adaptation of King's novel Carrie.

In 2014, the story was adapted into a feature film titled Mercy. Chandler Riggs portrayed George in the film. It received mixed reviews.

See also
Stephen King short fiction bibliography

References

1984 short stories
Short stories by Stephen King
Cthulhu Mythos short stories
Fantasy short stories
Horror short stories
Witchcraft in written fiction
Works originally published in American magazines
Works originally published in fantasy fiction magazines
Short stories adapted into films